Phan Thị Mỹ Tâm (born 16 January 1981, in Da Nang), whose stage name is Mỹ Tâm, is a Vietnamese singer and songwriter.

She is one of the most successful Vietnamese singers for two decades (2000s and 2010s), the most popular Vietnamese singer on the Spotify platform in 2021. Elle Style Awards 2019 honored singer My Tam in the Super icon category - Super Icon of the Year.

Life and career

Early life
Mỹ Tâm was born in Da Nang, Vietnam, in 1981. She started ballet at the age of six, and continued for three years. She then tried guitar and organ. She enjoyed singing, but did not regard it as a future career. She won first prize in her secondary school's singing competition, and the Gold Award at Beautiful Voice Spring, the city's solo singing competition. She was chosen for the Military School of Art in Hanoi; however, because of her family situation, she enrolled in Ho Chi Minh City Conservatory where she studied vocal training.

1999–2000: Debut 
Mỹ Tâm signed with Vafaco Record in 1999 and participated in many singing bands. She received many awards in various singing competitions. Her first demo song was "Nhé anh" (Please, Dear), written by Nguyen Ha, who helped her build image at the start of her career. She co-wrote a soft ballad, "Mãi yêu" (Endless Love), with Nguyen Quang.

After her contract with Vafaco ended in 2000, she had her hair cut short and colored to a yellow-brown "Korean style"; she also dressed sexier. In 2000, she worked at the Music Center in Ho Chi Minh City. She entered the Asia New Singer Competition that was held in Shanghai, China, and won a bronze medal, which she considered pivotal to becoming a singer. She graduated in 2001 as a top student.

2001–2002: Early success 

In 2001, Mỹ Tâm released her debut album Mãi Yêu (Endless Love). Her first major hit, "Toc Nau Moi Tram" (Brown Hair, Dark Lips), was an uptempo dance song that inspired a hair dying fad. Her title track established her as a young songwriter. "My Love Candle" and "Yêu Dại Khờ" (Foolish Love) became popular in karaoke establishments. "Hai mươi" (20), written by long-time musician Quốc Bảo, celebrated her twentieth birthday. It described her youthful energy that she brought to life, and became a popular anthem among university women. "Nhé anh" (Please, Dear) was a success, and was followed with a music video; however, the song was hampered by a copyright issue. Endless Love sold 54,000 copies.

Her first audio single, "Cây Đàn Sinh Viên" (The Guitar of Students), became an iconic song of the early 2000s among university students. It was used frequently by the media to portray the lives of students as warm, romantic, and artistic. It was the basis for her 2004 tour around various universities across the country.

In May 2002, she released her first video single, "Hát với Dòng Sông" (Singing with the River). The title song was successful but was criticized for having lazy and incomprehensible lyrics regardless of its catchy tune. The album also included packaged with "Cây Đàn Sinh Viên" (The Guitar of Students). A third track, "Quê Hương Tuổi Thơ Tôi" (Hometown - My Childhood), was initially not a hit because of the overshadowing success of the first two tracks, but eventually became a classic.

Her next audio single, "Dawn of Love", also released in May, was not as successful as "Singing with the River". However, one of its tracks, "Love If is Distant", became a karaoke hit.

Mỹ Tâm released her second studio album, Đâu Chỉ Riêng Em (Not Only Me) in May 2002. The album had more dance-pop than her first album, which was soft R&B, but still had some ballads such as "Khung trời mộng mơ" (Whimsical Sky), "Một lần và mãi mãi" (Once and Forever) and "Ánh Sao Buồn" (Sad Twinkle). "Búp Bê Không Tình Yêu" (Doll Without Love) was a translation of France Gall's "Poupée de cire, poupée de son". "Khi xưa ta bé" (When We Were Young) was a translation of Cher's "Bang Bang (My Baby Shot Me Down)", but made in an uptempo manner. "Giấc mơ tình yêu" (Love Dream) received airplay on radio and television, and was one of her biggest hits. "Hát Cho Người ở Lại" (Singing for the One who Stayed) also charted well.

2003–2005: Queen of V-Pop 
In mid 2003, Mỹ Tâm released her third studio album, Yesterday & Now. It contained two of her biggest hits: "Ước gì" (I Wish) and "Họa Mi Tóc Nâu" (Brown-Haired Nightingale). The former became another one of her signature songs, and she performed the song in her television appearances and concerts. The album sold over 60,000 copies within the first few months, and received positive responses from audiences and critics; however, some critics complained that the album lacked coherence and had poor arrangements. The tracks were mostly common ballads, but there were some variants.

The other hits from the album included "Mùa hè thương yêu" (Summer of Love), "Tình Em Còn Mãi", and "Niềm tin chiến thắng" (Belief of Victory). "Mùa hè thương yêu" described a student's feeling before the summer holiday period, that she was going to miss her friends, and regretted that summer came too quickly. It appealed strongly to teenagers. "Họa mi tóc nâu" was a reference to her earlier song "Tóc nâu môi trầm" (Brown hair Dark lips), but while the older song was a powerful dance track about an independent girl who feels how promising her love and her life is, "Nightingale" portrayed a young, innocent, but dedicated girl who is naive about love. In response to the gaffes she committed during her interviews for the first two albums, she changed her image for the third album, and grew her hair much longer than before. "Niềm tin chiến thắng" was a strong ballad that became a rally song for the Vietnamese team in the SEA Games. It is about a person who strongly believes in a day of victory, despite all the difficulties of the life around him.

In 2004, My Tam held a concert named "Ngày Ấy & Bây Giờ" (Yesterday and Now) in two big stadiums in Vietnam. The total expenditure for the concerts was about 3 billion đồng ($250,000 as of 2003), the most expensive concert funding in the Vietnamese music industry at that time. However, she became the first Vietnamese music artist to have a sold out stadium and her album sold over 100,000 copies, which made it the highest-selling album in Vietnamese recording history. She was recognized as the "Number one pop star in Vietnam" and "Queen of V-Pop." In 2004, she also held a televised concert "My Childhood Hometown", and went on a tour called "Live With Your Best".

After releasing her third album, she released a VCD album for Mãi Yêu (Endless Love). It consisted of some of her hits before Yesterday & Now, and a bonus track called "Xích lô" (Cyclo).

On 16 November 2004, she became the first Vietnamese singer to participate in the Asia Song Festival in Seoul, Korea. She sang "Ước gì" (I Wish) and "Nụ hôn bất ngờ" (Surprising Kiss), and received a Plaque of Appreciation and Best Contribution Award from the Korean Minister of Culture and Tourism. She would later collaborate with Korean producers in 2005.

In 2005, she released her fourth studio album, Hoàng Hôn Thức Giấc (The Color of My Life), where she composed many of the songs, such as: "Surprising Kiss", "Vì đâu" (How Come?), Untold Love, and "Nhớ..." (Remember...). Although it was less successful than her third album, "The Color of My Life" received critical acclaim for its coherence and for her creative control. It eventually sold 20,000 copies. She would later re-release the album with songs from her third album, and a bonus track called "Dường như ta đã" (We Seemed To Be...), which gave the album more of a pop/rock remix feel and contains one of her biggest hits "Dường Như Ta Đã" (We Seemed To Be), composed by her. Then she went on a Power of Dreams tour across different universities

2006–2008: Vút Bay (Fly), Thời Gian và Tôi (Time and Myself project) 
In 2006, Mỹ Tâm worked with Korean Record Narimaru Pictures for her fifth album, Fly. She stated that she was unsatisfied with Vietnamese recording and studio techniques. She also took more vocal training, dance lessons, and expanded her music genres. Instead of her usual pop and ballad style, she added uptempo R&B, hip-hop, and soul songs. Fly was released in December 2006. Many of its tracks were released with music videos: "Hãy đến với em" (Come To Me), "Bí mật" (Secret), and Untold Love? Mỹ Tâm also released a single that contained four re-recorded tracks sung in Korean: "Dường như ta đã" (We Seemed To Be...), "Giọt sương" (The Dew Drop), "Hãy đến với em" (Come To Me), and "Ngày hôm nay" (Today), the last of which was influenced by a R&B track by Alicia Keys. In 2007, she endorsed her first perfume brand called "My Time", which consists of four scents: passionate, charming, manly, and stylish.

In 2008, as part of her project Thời Gian và Tôi ( The Time and Myself ), She created her own company named Mỹ Tâm Entertainment (MT Entertainment). "Time and Myself"'s project has been planned to have five albums and a live show, and "is about those who always look back to the past to live a better future". She released her sixth album, Trở Lại (Come Back), on 17 April. Unlike Fly, the Korean producers were only in charge of recording and mastering the record. All the tracks were composed and handled by Vietnamese producers, including Mỹ Tâm, who produced "Như em dợi anh" (Like I'm Waiting For You). The album title expresses her return to the pop ballad genre with slow-jam and emotional feeling, and has a similar sound to her third album, but with the Korean influence. Come Back brought Mỹ Tâm to a new level in her career: a more professional voice, significantly improved English, and more skilled singing techniques (especially on the R&B track, "Và Em Có Anh" (And I Have You). Although the production is still Vietnamese, it contained a more international vibe, excellent quality, and characterized her as an evolving artist.

On 1 September, she released her seventh album, Nhịp Đập ( To the Beat ), which was also produced in Korea. She said that the songs have uptempo beats that "make you want to move and shake when you first hear it." She promoted this album and Come Back with a concert tour titled "Sóng Đa Tần" ( To The Beat ). She started the tour with a concert in Tao Dan stadium, Ho Chi Minh City, Vietnam. She won the "Singer of the year 2008" prize in the Devotion Award held by The Thao & Van Hoa (Sport & Culture) newspaper with participation and voting of 97 reporters. She would later release the concert DVD for Sóng Đa Tần ( To The Beat ).

2009-2011: Melodies of Time project, Television and film activity 

In April 2010, Mỹ Tâm released her compilation album, named after her project, Những Giai Điệu Của Thời Gian ( Melodies of Time ) project. In a slideshow article by ABC News (America) in August, she was listed among 12 "ABC's Global Pop Sensations You've Never Heard Of".

She participated as a judge on the fourth season of Sao Mai Điểm Hẹn, a biannual reality-television singing competition by VTV3. She judged alongside music producers Tuấn Khanh and Hồ Hoài Anh. She was noted for her frank and hard-hitting remarks, but displayed a sense of humor, and gave constructive feedback to the contestants. She received positive publicity for her fashion choices during the series as she matched her outfits to each theme in the competition.

She starred in the musical television drama Cho Một Tình Yêu (For a Love), which was produced by BHD film studio, and directed by Nguyễn Tranh of Lê Hóa. She also served as the musical director, where she composed some original songs, and mixed in others. She would later release a single of the title track with eight different versions, each of which involved a different instrument, including guitar, piano, trombone and trumpet.

The series premiered on VTV3 on 7 October, and ran for 37 episodes. It was the first to star many contemporary Vietnamese singers including herself, Tuấn Hưng, Quang Dũng, Minh Thuận, and Minh Tú. After the first episode aired, Mỹ Tam's fans uploaded her songs which generated 50,000 hits overnight. On one forum, the series generated over 9,000 comments. The media considered the reaction to her work unprecedented. While the series received mixed reviews from critics regarding the plot and acting, the musical scenes were praised for their originality and congruousness.

2012–2015: Vietnam Idol, Tâm and The Voice of Vietnam 
In May 2012, Mỹ Tâm performed at the MTV EXIT concert alongside Simple Plan at the My Dinh Stadium in Ha Noi for the purpose of propaganda against human trafficking. She was appointed MTV EXIT's representative in Vietnam. On 29 May 2012, Mỹ Tâm was announced to be replacing Siu Black as a judge for the fourth season of Vietnam Idol alongside remaining judges Quốc Trung and Nguyễn Quang Dũng. The season aired in August 2012. Throughout the competition, Mỹ Tâm praised Huong Giang, a top-16 contestant and a transgender woman. "The thing that surprises me is not your voice, it's your effort," she said. "Your singing is not absolutely excellent, but your effort makes us want to see how you can improve." The contestant had previously competed as a male, and the sex change gave her a second chance to compete.

From 2013 and 2014 Mỹ Tâm had been working on her eighth studio album, "Tâm" (self-titled). The album was officially released on 24 March 2013, including 10 original tracks composed by Mỹ Tâm herself and various Korean music producers. The album received positive reviews from critics and was a commercial success overall, with 5,000 copies sold on its first day of release and reaching number one for weeks in a number of downloads on iTunes. In order to promote the album, many music videos have been produced on her official YouTube account, with high interactivity during the release.

On 24 August 2013, Mỹ Tâm set up an acoustic-styled music show called "Send to My Love" in Ho Chi Minh City. She continued to bring the show to Hanoi on 26 October, before hosting a charity event in Da Nang on 16 January 2014. Mỹ Tâm confirmed her return to Vietnam Idol for its fifth season on 21 September. In the celebration ceremony of 2 years MTV Europe Music Award's establishment on 27 September 2013, My Tam became the first representative of Vietnam to be nominated for the "Best Worldwide Act" award. After lost to Li Yuchun from China, she received the "Outstanding Southeast Asian Artist" trophy from MTV Vietnam representative on the Vietnam Idol stage on 23 March 2014. On 22 October 2013, Mỹ Tâm released a music video for the song "Em phải làm sao", which received 200,000 views on the day of its publication. After Vietnam Idol wrapped up its fifth season in May 2014, Mỹ Tâm guest judged Your Face Sounds Familiar for a week's performance show which was broadcast on 7 June. Mỹ Tâm won a VTV Award for the "Outstanding Artist" category on 5 September.

On 28 September 2014, Mỹ Tâm announced her first concert after 10 years- "Heartbeat", taking place in Ho Chi Minh City and Hanoi, with free ticket. The two concerts attracted approximately 40,000 people at the Military Zone 7 Stadium in Ho Chi Minh City; and about 25,000 audiences at Hang Day Stadium in Hanoi. Her tour was positively received by critics, and brought her a nomination for the 2015 "Tour of the Year" category of the Devotion Award. A DVD which recorded the showcase of Heartbeat in Ho Chi Minh City on 20 April 2015, before the release of the two live shows in Ho Chi Minh City and Hanoi on 22 and 26 April 2015 respectively, to recreate the atmosphere of "Heartbeat" with highlight performances throughout the two shows, had sold 3,600 copies in just 4 hours of debut. The DVD gathered more than 1 billion and 80 million VND as well as reached the milestone of 10,000 copies in a month.

On 12 April 2015, Mỹ Tâm was the last to confirm to become a coach on the third season of The Voice of Vietnam alongside Thu Phương, Tuấn Hưng and Đàm Vĩnh Hưng. Her final contestant, Đức Phúc was crowned the winner on the finale broadcast on 20 September, making Tâm the winning coach on her first attempt as a coach. However, Tâm did not return to The Voice for its fourth season and was replaced by Tóc Tiên. At the VTV Award 2015 took place on 6 September, Mỹ Tâm won the "Artist of the Year" category for the second consecutive time.

2016-present: Tâm 9 album and First Love concert 
From 2016 to 2017, Mỹ Tâm focused on making her ninth album, and release not many music videos like "Đôi mắt màu xanh", 'Hãy về với nhau" and "Cuộc tình không may". On 3 December 2017, Mỹ Tâm released her ninth studio pop soul album, Tâm 9. In the first day release, 5,000 copies of Tâm 9 was sold out in 1 hour. Until now, more than 20,000 CD were sold in Vietnam and became the "best selling album in Vietnam". On the January 2018, "Tâm 9" has climbed to No. 10 on the Billboard World Albums Chart, making her the first Vietnamese singer to break into the top 10. Also, "Tâm 9" was listed as "best selling album" on ITunes and Amazon. In March 2018, Tâm was honored with the titles of "Singer of the Year" and "Album of the year" (Tam 9) at the Devotion Music Awards 2018.

On 20 October 2018, Tâm's concert, titled "My Tam, First Love", was held at the Jangchung Gymnasium in the central of Seoul. It was an important landmark in her career because holding a concert in a foreign country meant meeting regional coverage requirements and having the financial resources to organize it. There were 4000 people attended. After that, she became the first Southeast Asia singer to hold a concert in Jangchung Gymnasium.

Charities
On 4 April 2008, Mỹ Tâm established the My Tam (MT) Foundation, a charity that operates on contributions from MT Entertainment, her fans, and others. "Nâng bước ngày mai" ("Sustain the Steps of Tomorrow") is a prominent, long-term project that has reached cities and regions including Ho Chi Minh City, Huế, Da Nang, Nghệ An, Gia Lai, Bình Định, Phú Yên, Cần Thơ, Đắk Lắk, An Giang and Hà Tĩnh.  The project builds houses for the poor, and also has scholarships for the underprivileged. Every year, MT Foundation creates a lot of charity for poor people in the remote area.

Artistry

Voice 
Mỹ Tâm has a three-octave vocal range.  She is a mezzo-soprano with a deep, powerful and clear voice. that fits her into a variety of genres, including pop, dance and rock. Prior to her album Fly (Vút Bay), she was criticized for her lackluster performances that tended to focus more on vocal mechanics than emotions. However, Fly was highly acclaimed by singer Mỹ Linh, as it "marked Mỹ Tâm's wise move with her voice becoming more subtle and emotional, which would do her good in the long run".

Themes and musical style 

Mỹ Tâm has been praised for her live singing while performing complex dance moves. In her live shows and concert tours, she sings 20-30 songs, and maintains a strong, passionate voice.

Discography

Studio albums

Mãi Yêu (Endless Love) (2001)
Đâu Chỉ Riêng Em (I'm Not The Only One) (2002)
Ngày Ấy & Bây Giờ (Yesterday & Now) (2003)
Hoàng Hôn Thức Giấc (The Color of My Life) (2005)
Vút Bay (Fly) (2006)
Trở Lại (The Return) (2008)
Nhịp đập (TO THE BEAT) (2008)
Tâm (2013)
Tâm 9 ( (2017)

Reissue
Dường Như Ta Đã.../ Live Tour Sức Mạnh Của Những Ước Mơ (We Seemed To Be.../ 'The Power of Dreams' Tour Album)

Compilation albums

Melodies of Time 1: Những Giai Điệu Của Thời Gian 1 (2010)
Melodies of Time 2: Những Giai Điệu Của Thời Gian 2 - Quê hương Đất nước (2010)

Soundtracks
Album nhạc phim Cho một tình yêu (For A Love The Soundtrack) (2010)
Album nhạc phim Chị Trợ Lý Của Anh (My Dear Assistant!: Original Motion Picture Soundtrack) (2019)

Singles & EPs

 "Thoát ly" (Outbreak) (2001)
 "Cây đàn sinh viên" (The Guitar of Youth) (March 2002) including title track, "Quê hương tuổi thơ tôi" (My Childhood Hometown) and "Tiếng lòng xao động" (Love awakes)
 "Ban mai tình yêu" (Dawn of Love) (May 2002) including the title track, "Tình lỡ cách xa" (Falling Apart) and "Vấn vương" (Longing)
 "Dấu chấm hỏi" (Question mark) (2002)
 "Hát với dòng sông" (Sing with the River) (2002)
 "Giai điệu tình yêu: Tiếng hát Mỹ Tâm" (Love Songs from Mỹ Tâm) (2003) including various tracks such as "Đôi cánh tình yêu" (Wings of Love) and "Hãy tha thứ cho em" (Forgive Me)
 "Dường Như Ta Đã... (We Seemed To be...) (Single) (2005)
 "Hãy Đến Bên Em (I KNOW YOU KNOW)" (Single) (2006)
 "Giọt Sương" (THE DEWDROP)(Single) (2006)
 "Bí Mật" (SECRET) (2006)
 "Em Chờ Anh (Waiting for you)" (2006)
 "Ngày Hôm Nay (Today)" (2007)
 "Cho một tình yêu - Mini Album" (For A Love - EP) (2011) - [including different versions of the title track]

Digital singles

 "Trắng Đen (Black n White)" - The Digital Single (2012) - Composer: TRẦN TUẤN ANH, MỸ TÂM
 "Chuyện Như Chưa Bắt Đầu (Like There Was No Beginning) - The Digital Single" (2012)
 "Sai (Wrong)" (2012)
 "Vì Em Quá Yêu Anh (Single)" (CRAZY LOVE) (2013)
 "Sự Thật Ta Yêu Nhau" (THE TRUTH) (Single)" (2013)
 "My Friend" (Single) (2013)
 "Gởi tình yêu của em (Letter To My Love)" (Single) (2013)
 "Còn Lại (Hurt)" (2014)
 "Em Phải Làm Sao? (What Can I Do?)" (2014)
 "Nắm Lấy Tay Nhau (HOLD MY HAND)" (2014)
 "Thương Ca Tiếng Việt" (An Ode To Mothertongue) (2014)
 "Khi Cô Đơn Anh Gọi Tên Em (Single)" (Kokoro No Tomo - Cover) (2015)
 "Đôi Mắt Màu Xanh (Blue Eyes) (Single) (2016)
 "Hãy Về Với Nhau (Come Back To Me) (Single) (2016) // Note: This single was the sequel to "Em phải làm sao" (What Should I Do) music video as well as the final installment of the music video trilogy starting from "Chuyện như chưa bắt đầu" (Pretend we had no start).
 "Cuộc Tình Không May" (Tragic Love Affair) (2016)
 "EM THÌ KHÔNG (I Don't) [Remix] Featuring Karik" (Toi Jamais Cover) (2017)
 "Đâu chỉ Riêng Em" (Not Only Me) (2017)
 "Đừng Hỏi Em" (Don't ask me) (2017)
 "Nếu Có Buông tay" (If You Let Go) (2017)
 "Người Hãy Quên Em Đi" (Please Forget Me) (2018)
 "Anh Chưa Từng Biết" (You Never Know) (2018)
 "Rực Rỡ Tháng Năm (from "Tháng Năm Rực Rỡ" Soundtrack) " (Those Were The Days - from "SUNNY" Remake Soundtrack) 
 "Muộn Màng là Từ Lúc (Late From The Beginning)" (Single) (2018)
 "Nơi Mình Dừng Chân (from "Chị Trợ Lý Của Anh" Soundtrack)" (Where The End Is Near- from "Dear My assistant!" Original Motion Pictures Soundtrack) (2019)
 "Khi Ta Yêu (from "Chị Trợ Lý Của Anh" Soundtrack)" (When We Were In Love - from "Dear My assistant!" Original Motion Pictures Soundtrack) (2019)
 "Đời Là Giấc Mơ (from "Chị Trợ Lý Của Anh" Soundtrack)" (The Good Life - from "Dear My assistant!" Original Motion Pictures Soundtrack) (2019)
 "Nếu Anh Đi (If You Leave)" (Single) (2019)
 "Con Gái Như Em (from "Chị Trợ Lý Của Anh" Soundtrack) (A Girl Like You - from "Dear My assistant!" Original Motion Pictures Soundtrack) (2019)
 "Anh Đợi Em Được Không?" (Can You Wait For Me?) - Single (2019)
 "Vậy Cũng Vui" (Fine For Me) - Single (2020)
 "Đúng Cũng Thành Sai" (Right Also Becomes Wrong) - Single (2020)
 "Anh Chưa Biết Đâu" (You Don't Know Anything) - Single (2020)
 "Hào Quang" (Halo) - Single (2021)

Tour / Live Concerts 
Liveshow: Yesterday & Now  (2004)
Live Tour: The Power of Dreams (2006)
Live Concert Tour: To The Beat - The Multi-frequency Wave (2008)
Liveshow: Melodies of Times - 10 Years Anniversary (2011)
Live Concert: For a Love (2011)
Live Concert: LETTER TO MY LOVE (2013)
Live Concert Tour: HEARTBEAT (2014)
My Tam & Kotaro Oshio: Dreaming Together In Osaka (2015)
Liveshow Ô Cửa Màu Xanh (2016)
The Showcase Tour 'Tâm 9 (2017)
Live Concert 'First Love' in Seoul (2018)
Liveshow Tri Âm (Soulmates - The Liveshow) (2021)
My Soul 1981 (2022)
The My Soul 1981 Gala - Live in Da Lat (2022)

 Television 
 Sao Mai Điểm Hẹn (2010) - Judge (fourth season)
 Vietnam Idol (2012 - 2013) (2013 - 2014) - Judge (Vietnam Idol (season 4))
 The Voice (2015) - Judge (season 3)
 Cover Star Vietnam (2017) - judge (season 2)
 Giọng Ca Bât Bại (2018) - judge

 Filmography 
 Cho Một Tình Yêu (For a Love) (2010 - 2011) - as Linh Đan
 Chị trợ lý của anh (My Dear Assistant!) (2019) - as Khả Doanh

 Tours / Live Concerts 

 Awards 

 Major awards 

The award is considered as an "Grammy Award" in Vietnamese music.

Golden Apricot Blossom Awards

Green Wave Music AwardsGreen Wave  Music Awards' is one of the oldest and most prestigious annual music awards in the Vietnamese music industry. It was started in 1997 with the governing body being the 99.9 MHz FM radio station of the Voice of the People of Ho Chi Minh City.

MTV Europe Music Awards

See also

 List of singers
 List of Vietnamese people

Notes

References

External links 
 
 
 Mỹ Tâm album list on Billboard
 Mỹ Tâm on Doligo Music

1981 births
Living people
People from Da Nang
Vietnamese pop singers
21st-century Vietnamese women singers
MTV Europe Music Award winners